Haydn Bunton may refer to:

 Haydn Bunton Sr. (1911–1955), Australian rules footballer
 Haydn Bunton Jr. (born 1937), Australian rules footballer, son of the above